The Rewan air crash occurred on 16 November 1943 when a Dakota C-47 of the 21st Troop Carrier Squadron of the 374th Troop Carrier Group crashed at Rewan, Queensland, south of Rolleston, Queensland, killing all 19 people on board.

Those killed consisted of fourteen military personnel from the Australian Army and the Royal Australian Air Force, and five personnel from the United States Army Air Corps.

The aircraft was en route from Darwin to Brisbane, having already completed scheduled stops in Daly Waters and Cloncurry.

It's believed the aircraft encountered a violent electrical storm south of Rolleston which caused it disintegrate and crash on Rewan Station.  The wreckage was discovered on 18 November 1943.

The bodies recovered from the wreckage were initially taken to Springsure before being transported to Rockhampton. The bodies of the Americans were then taken to Ipswich where they were buried, before being returned to the United States.  The bodies of the Australians were buried in the Rockhampton War Cemetery at the North Rockhampton Cemetery on 25 November 1943.

A memorial, which consists of the aircraft's engines, wings and undercarriage, was erected near the crash site in 2004.  It was dedicated at a special ceremony on 26 April 2004.

Due to wartime censorship, there was no press coverage of the Rewan disaster at the time, which was similar to what occurred following the Canal Creek air crash north of Rockhampton and the Bakers Creek air crash near Mackay.  There was only a fleeting mention of both the Rewan and Canal Creek disasters in Rockhampton's local newspaper The Morning Bulletin in September 1945 at the conclusion of World War II, almost two years after the disasters.

See also
Bakers Creek air crash

References 

Accidents and incidents involving the Douglas C-47 Skytrain
Queensland in World War II
Aviation accidents and incidents in Queensland
1943 in Australia
1943 disasters in Australia